Arthur Percy Bryse (13 September 1908 – 18 June 1990) was an Australian rules footballer who played for the Hawthorn Football Club in the Victorian Football League (VFL).

External links 

1908 births
1990 deaths
Australian rules footballers from Melbourne
Hawthorn Football Club players
People from Prahran, Victoria